Sunland Park Mall is a shopping mall in El Paso, Texas, owned and operated by Washington Prime Group. It is located on El Paso's west side, at Interstate 10 and Sunland Park Drive. It features five anchor stores operating under four brand names, and more than 130 specialty stores on two enclosed levels. It is the second-largest mall of the three in the metro area, behind Cielo Vista Mall.

Construction of the mall was completed in 1988, and it opened to the public on August 31 of that year. It is approximately one mile from Sunland Park Racetrack & Casino, a racino just across the state line in Sunland Park, New Mexico. It is about four miles (6 km) from the border with Mexico.

Macy's closed its Sunland Park Mall store in 2017. Western Wear moved into the former Macy's space.

Forever 21 closed in 2018.

On November 8, 2018, it was announced that Sears will be closing this location in early 2019 a part of a plan to close 40 stores.

Anchors
Dillard's Men 
Dillard's Women
Starr Western Wear
Conn's (Old Sears)
TruFit Athletic Club (Old Sears)
Monkey Rock Family Entertainment Center (Opening April-May 2022 in Old Sears Space)

Former Anchors
Foley's (became Macy's in 2006)
Forever 21 (closed in 2018)
JCPenney (closed in 2002, replaced by Foley's)
Macy's (closed in 2017, replaced by Starr Western Wear)
Mervyn's (closed in 2008, replaced by Forever 21)
Montgomery Ward (closed in 2001, replaced by Dillard's Men)
Sears (closed in 2019)
The Popular Dry Goods (closed in 1995, replaced by Sears)

Wurlitzer theatre organ
A Mighty Wurlitzer theater organ, originally located in El Paso's Plaza Theatre, was located at the mall while the shuttered theater was being renovated for reopening. The organ was returned to the area from a Dallas, Texas collector and installed at the mall. The organ returned to the Plaza when it reopened in 2006.

References

External links 
 WP Glimcher
 Sunland Park Mall website

Buildings and structures in El Paso, Texas
Washington Prime Group
Shopping malls in Texas
Economy of El Paso, Texas
Shopping malls established in 1988
Tourist attractions in El Paso, Texas